Plants vs. Zombies: Garden Warfare 2 is a 2016 third-person shooter video game developed by PopCap Games and published by Electronic Arts. It was released for PlayStation 4, Windows, and Xbox One. It is the sequel to Plants vs. Zombies: Garden Warfare. The game was released in February 2016. A successor, Plants vs. Zombies: Battle for Neighborville was released in October 2019.

Gameplay

Plants vs. Zombies: Garden Warfare 2 is a third-person shooter, similar to Garden Warfare. Gameplay largely remained the same as its predecessor, with the addition of 10 (6 are immediately accessible, 2 which must be unlocked through a series of tough trials and 2 which can only be played within the game's endless mode) new plant and zombie classes, a zombie version of Garden Ops, titled Graveyard Ops, and a new mode called Herbal Assault, a swapped version of Gardens and Graveyards where the Zombies must defend the bases and prevent the Plants from capturing them, which supports a maximum 24 players per game. Different classes have different abilities. Most characters and modes (Team Vanquish, Garden Ops, etc.) from the original Garden Warfare returned, as well a new "remix" music from the original Garden Warfare for the Zombies. New abilities for returning characters were also introduced in Garden Warfare 2. The new plant characters are Citron, Rose, Kernel Corn and Torchwood. The new zombie characters are Imp, Super Brainz, Captain Deadbeard and Hover-Goat 3000. The old plant characters are Peashooter, Sunflower, Chomper, and Cactus, while the old zombies are Soldier, Engineer, Scientist, and All-Star.

Unlike the original Garden Warfare where players can play solo only on Garden Ops, via private mode, in Garden Warfare 2 every mode in the game can be played solo. Split-screen multiplayer, private servers, twelve maps and forty different characters will be supported at launch. Free additional content will also be released regularly upon the game's release. An internet connection will still be required as in the first game.

A new mode called Backyard Battleground is also introduced. It serves as a hub world that is free for players to explore. In Backyard Battleground, players can access portals that are connected to missions, view unlocked characters' bobbleheads, collect collectibles scattered in the world, and join King of the Hill-style matches known as Flag of power matches against artificial intelligence at will. When playing Backyard Battleground, the game will send waves of enemy heroes, although the game will also send crates, containing either an AI ally or coins. There are also plant pots or places where the player can build either plant turrets or Zombie bots. A shooting gallery and moon-based missions are also featured.

Plant and zombie variants the player earned in the original game will automatically transfer to this game. The UI has been improved, with Crazy Dave and Dr. Zomboss shown talking in 3D model of themselves (rather than appearing as 2D designs from the original Plants vs. Zombies).

At the bases of both the Plants and the Zombies, there are several common features, including a Customization Room allowing the player to change and accessorize characters, a Quest Board with different objectives for Plants, Multiplayer, and Zombies, sticker Shops, a Multiplayer Portal, a Mailbox, and a special Garage, with quest missions for both sides.

The game also includes many exclusive rewards for players who have played the original Garden Warfare. The player can use their Mailbox in either side's base to import all of the unlocked characters and abilities that they have unlocked in Garden Warfare, depending on if they actually played the first game. They can also use their rank from GW1 to get loyalty rewards, which rank from sticker packs to an extremely exclusive character for those who reached the max rank 313, the Unicorn Chomper. Also, players who either pre-ordered or purchased the deluxe edition of Garden Warfare 2 will get many exclusive items, from emoji customizations to an exclusive Mass Effect-themed character, the Z7 Imp.

Modes 
Most of the modes from Garden Warfare are returning to Garden Warfare 2 (the only mode not returning is Taco Bandits, although it was slightly altered into the Capture the Taco game mode), while several new modes have been added, including a zombie version of Garden Ops, Graveyard Ops, and an alternative of Gardens and Graveyards, Herbal Assault, in which the plants attack and the zombies defend.
 Backyard Battleground: A hub world for the player, which is a large map divided in two, with the plants on one side of the Backyard and the zombies being on the other. In the middle, the plant and zombie forces fight each other constantly, and is also where the 'Flag of Power' game mode is located. The player can access the Garden Ops and Graveyard Ops modes through Crazy Dave's RV or Dr. Zomboss' blimp in each side's base, and can access every other mode through the Multiplayer Portal, where they can choose to play any mode solo, private with friends or go online in multiplayer. The player can pick up daily quests from the Quest Board to complete, can buy sticker packs from the Sticker Shop, customize their characters in the Customization Booth, promote leveled up characters in the Stats Room, complete quests around the Backyard and can also take part in solo story quests for either Crazy Dave or Dr. Zomboss from any NPC characters. There is also a sewer system where the player can find hidden areas and the new Crazy Targets shooting range.
 Flag of Power: A King of the Hill-inspired mode in which the player must defend the 'Flag of Power' from the opposite faction, who will constantly send out waves of enemies, with each wave being more difficult than the one before. After each wave the player will be rewarded with coins. In-between each wave, a crate will be dropped for the players to break open, and doing so will release an AI reinforcement that will help the player fight. The mode is endless so the player cannot actually 'win', but rather see how long they can keep the flag raised. The game ends when the flag is dropped completely.
 Garden Ops: A cooperative mode where up to four players take control of each of the plants defending a garden through ten zombie waves, with the fifth and tenth waves being boss waves represented by a slot machine, hosted by Dr. Zomboss, either spawning 1-3 bosses, a jackpot, a huge swarm of zombies or a Super Boss. After that, they must run and survive to the extraction point to be saved by Crazy Dave.
 Graveyard Ops: The opposite of Garden Ops. Graveyard Ops is a cooperative mode where up to four players take control of each of the zombies defending a graveyard through ten plant waves, with the fifth and tenth waves being boss waves represented by a slot machine, hosted by Crazy Dave, either spawning 1-3 bosses, a jackpot, a huge swarm of plants or a Super Boss. After that, they must run to the extraction point and survive until they are saved by Dr. Zomboss.
Solo Ops: A Solo version of the Ops Modes, in which the player can choose up to 3 AI helpers and swap between them.
 Team Vanquish: A team deathmatch variant, where two teams representing plants and zombies fight against each other to take down opponents.
 Vanquish Confirmed!: A game mode where players must collect orbs from fallen opponents to receive credit.
 Gardens and Graveyards: A game mode where players either capture (as zombies) or defend (as plants) various objectives.
 Herbal Assault: A game mode which is the opposite of Gardens and Graveyards, where players either capture (as plants) or defend (as zombies) various objectives.
 Gnome Bomb: A game mode where players attempt to secure a bomb (strapped to the back of a helpless gnome) and detonate at various bases.
 Mixed Mode: A playlist where each regular game mode is used interchangeably.
 Suburbination: A domination variant, where the objective is to capture three areas, A, B, and C in the map. If all three areas are captured, 'Suburbination' occurs and the team who captured them all get bonuses until they lose an area.
 Infinity Time: A cooperative endless mode where players either take control of a giant robotic triceratops or a giant robotic cat, and must vanquish waves of gnomes to earn Time Shards. Every five waves, the gnome king, Gnomus, will send out an imposter king for the players to fight. Once defeated, the player/s will be teleported to a different coloured realm, starting from blue, then going to green, then yellow, then red, then rainbow, in that order. The mode doesn't end until all players have been taken out. The rewards the player/s receive depends on the amount of Time Shards the player/s collected.
 Boss Hunt: a cooperative game mode that is usually held once a month. This requires a team of 4 or less to defeat a boss that will have more or less health depending on difficulty. The difficulty is chosen by choosing the normal, enchanted or scrumptious version of the item on the platter.
 Cats vs Dinos: This is a last team standing style game with no respawn. This is usually held once every month. This uses the same characters as 'Infinity Time'.
 Capture the Taco: This game mode takes place in 5 possible maps, 4 from the other modes and 1 exclusive one which is a modified Backyard Battleground. This is a capture-the-flag style mode where each team has a taco to defend against the other team. Each team must defend their own taco, as well as capture the other team's taco by picking it up and taking it to the base at the back of the team's corresponding side. This is a modified version of Taco Bandits from the original Garden Warfare, where only the zombies were on the offense.
 Soil Survivors: A Battle Royale style mode with a max of 12 players. It is similar to Cats vs Dinos in that each player has one life per round. The round ends when all of one team is eliminated. Each match is a first-to-three round wins to decide the winning team. There is also a shrinking zone mechanic in this mode, and when a player leaves the shrinking zone they take continuous heavy damage, to prevent "camping".

Setting
The game takes place in the present day after the events of Garden Warfare where, after a long war, the Plants have been defeated by the Zombies (including the well-advanced ones) after Dr. Edgar George Zomboss contacts his future self and obtains the more technologically advanced Z-Mech, which is piloted by Zombie Imps. The Zombies use it to turn the tide on the Plants and conquer Suburbia, which they rename Zomburbia. The Plants go to war against the Zombies to reclaim their home and fight for what is left of Suburbia.  At the start of the game, the player grows in Zomburbia as a Sunflower and is warped out by Crazy Dave, landing in the Plants' side of the Backyard Battleground.

In July 2015, it was announced that a 3-part tie-in comic book series published by Dark Horse Comics is scheduled for release in October 2015. It is set before the events of Garden Warfare 2 and explains how the Zombies defeated the Plants and conquered Neighborville (Suburbia).

Development
A new Plants vs. Zombies video game was revealed in Electronic Arts' annual earning reports. A sequel to Garden Warfare was teased on June 8, 2015. A trailer for Plants vs. Zombies: Garden Warfare 2 was presented for the first time at E3 2015 as part of the presentation given by Microsoft and on August 22, 2015, during Xbox Live's webcast of the Miss Teen USA 2015 beauty pageant. A mashup with Mass Effect called Grass Effect was announced at Gamescom 2015. Players who pre-order the game would receive a Mass Effect-inspired mech-suit for the new class, The Imp. BioWare assisted PopCap with developing the Grass Effect mech-suit.

An open beta testing for the game was held from January 14, 2016, to January 18, 2016, for the PlayStation 4 and Xbox One. However, this was largely for multiplayer tuning, and many of the game modes and Backyard Battleground secrets were disabled. A trial version of the game was released by the end of April 2016. This version of the game allows players to play the game for up to ten hours.

They have released their first free content update called The Graveyard Variety Pack. It was released on March 8, 2016, and it contains some character balancing, a new map Aqua Center, and some Backyard Battleground changes and additions. Another pack, titled Trouble in Zombopolis, was released in June 2016. It adds a new map called Zombopolis, and several new characters. Trouble in Zombopolis: Part Two was released in June 2016, introducing new features such as community challenges, delivering challenges, platforming elements, and new spawn points. EA partnered with Diamond Select Toys to release action figures featuring Garden Warfare 2 characters.

Reception

Plants vs. Zombies: Garden Warfare 2 received "generally favorable" reviews, according to review aggregator Metacritic.

Kevin Dunsmore of Hardcore Gamer gave the game a 4 out of 5 saying, "PopCap Games paid close attention to the criticisms of the original game and ultimately crafted a worthy sequel." Jordan Devore from Destructoid rated the game a 9/10 saying, "The hub world is a far more realized slice of the wider Plants vs. Zombies universe, and it's so delightfully odd." IGN gave the game a score of 8.2/10, saying that the game "is all grown up into a premiere shooter".

The game's retail version was the second best-selling game in its week of release in the UK, debuting at No. 2 in the UK retail software sales chart, behind Far Cry Primal.

Follow-up game
A successor, Plants vs. Zombies: Battle for Neighborville was released in October 2019 for PlayStation 4, Windows, and Xbox One, and in March 2021 for the Nintendo Switch.

References

External links

2016 video games
Frostbite (game engine) games
Hero shooters
Multiplayer and single-player video games
Garden Warfare 2
PlayStation 4 games
PopCap games
Third-person shooters
Tower defense video games
Video game sequels
Video games about plants
Windows games
Xbox Cloud Gaming games
Xbox One games
Video games about zombies
Split-screen multiplayer games
Electronic Arts games
Video games developed in the United States
Video games set in the United States
Video games set on the Moon